The Woodbury Central Community School District is a public school district headquartered in Moville, Iowa.  It is completely within Woodbury County, and serves the town of Moville, the unincorporated community of Climbing Hill, and the surrounding rural areas.

The district was created in 1962, from the consolidation of Moville and Climbing Hill.

Schools
The district operates three schools, all in Moville:
 Moville Elementary School
 Woodbury Central Middle School
 Woodbury Central High School

Woodbury Central High School

Athletics
The Wildcats compete in the Western Valley Activities Conference in the following sports:
Cross Country
Volleyball
Football
 1980 Class 1A State Champions
Basketball
Track and Field
Golf
Baseball
Softball
 2002 Class 1A State Champions

References

External links
 Woodbury Central Community School District

School districts in Iowa
1962 establishments in Iowa
School districts established in 1962
Education in Woodbury County, Iowa